This is a listing of the horses that finished in either first, second, or third place and the number of starters in the Henry S. Clark Stakes, an American stakes race for horses three years old and older at one mile on the turf held at Pimlico Race Course in Baltimore, Maryland.

See also 

 Henry S. Clark Stakes
 Pimlico Race Course
 List of graded stakes at Pimlico Race Course

References 

Pimlico Race Course